The 1997 Asian Junior Badminton Championships is an Asia continental junior championships to crown the best U-19 badminton players across Asia. This tournament were held in Ninoy Aquino Stadium, Manila, Philippines from 7-13 April 1997.

Medalists 
In the team event, China clinched the boys' and girs' team event after beat Indonesia in the final with the score 3–2 and 5–0 respectively. The boys' team bronze goes to Malaysia and South Korea, while the girls' team bronze goes to Japan and South Korea.

Semifinals results

Medal table

References

External links 
 Quarter-finals results at worldbadminton.com
 Semi final results at worldbadminton.com
 Finals at kyobado.com

Badminton Asia Junior Championships
Asian Junior Badminton Championships
Asian Junior Badminton Championships
International sports competitions hosted by the Philippines
1997 in youth sport